Sahmui-ye Jonubi (also Romanized as Sahmūī-ye Jonūbī; also known as Sahmoo Jonoobi, Sahmū, Sahmū-e Pā’īn, Sahmū Janūbī, Sahmū Pā’īn, Sahmū-ye Janūbī, and Sahmū-ye Jonūbī) is a village in Chah-e Mobarak Rural District, Chah-e Mobarak District, Asaluyeh County, Bushehr Province, Iran. At the 2006 census, its population was 756, in 114 families.

References 

Populated places in Asaluyeh County